This is a list of American football players who have played for the Detroit Lions or for the Portsmouth Spartans (1930–33), in the National Football League (NFL). It includes players that have played at least one match in the NFL regular season. The Detroit Lions franchise was founded in Portsmouth, Ohio as the Portsmouth Spartans. In 1934, the franchise moved to Detroit and changed their name to the Lions, which was a play on the name of the Detroit Tigers.

A

 Kevin Abrams
 Blue Adams
 Abraham Addams
 Jamal Agnew
 Dave Ahrens
 Tony Aiello
 Ikaika Alama-Francis
 Grady Alderman
 Allen Aldridge
 Bruce Alexander
 Gerald Alexander
 Stephen Alexander
 Mike Alford
 Jimmy Allen
 Nate Allen
 Kurt Allerman
 Walt Ambrose
 Stanley Andersen
 Courtney Anderson
 Gary Anderson
 Gary Anderson
 Scotty Anderson
 Eric Andolsek
 Charley Ane
 Leo Araguz
 Jim Arnold
 John Arnold
 Richard Ashcom
 George Atkins
 James Atkins
 Alexander Atty
 James Austin
 Rodney Austin

B

 Steve Baack
 Jeff Backus
 Boss Bailey
 Byron Bailey
 Robert Bailey
 Al Baker
 John Baker, Jr.
 Karl Baldischwiler
 Johnny Baldwin
 Jerry Ball
 Larry Ball
 Reggie Ball
 Vince Banonis
 Bradford Banta
 Lem Barney
 Terry Barr
 Alex Barrett
 Scott Barrows
 Idrees Bashir
 Mike Bass
 Charlie Batch
 Mario Bates
 Stan Batinski
 Tony Beckham
 Tom E. Beer
 Alexander F. Bell
 Anthony Bell
 Bob Bell
 Joique Bell
 Marcus Bell
 Tatum Bell
 Ronald Bellamy
 Tommy Bennett
 Chuck Bernard
 Matt Bernstein
 Ed Berrang
 Connie Mack Berry
 Eric Beverly
 Les Bingaman
 Bennie Blades
 Greg Blue
 Matt Blundin
 Dré Bly
 Shaun Bodiford
 Patrick Body
 Russ Bolinger
 Richard Booth
 Cloyce Box
 Stephen Boyd
 Thomas Boyd
 Corey Bradford
 Jon Bradley
 Luther Bradley
 Charlie Bradshaw
 Carl Brettschneider
 Mike Brim
 Lou Brock Jr.
 Barrett Brooks
 Kevin Brooks
 Michael Brooks
 Mark Brown
 Charlie Brown
 Corwin Brown
 Howie Brown
 J. B. Brown
 Lomas Brown
 Ray Brown
 Reggie Brown
 Roger Brown
 Anthony Bryant
 Fernando Bryant
 Shawn Bryson
 Daniel Bullocks
 Dan Bunz
 Nate Burleson
 Sam Busich
 Dexter Bussey
 Paul Butcher Sr.
 Kelly Butler

C

 Ernie Caddel
 Brian Calhoun
 Jim "J.R." Callahan
 Bill Callihan
Lamar Campbell
 Dan Campbell
 Stan Campbell
 Anthony Cannon
 Lloyd Cardwell
 Lew Carpenter
 Mark Carrier
 Darren Carrington
 Anthony Carter
 Marty Carter
 Pat Carter
 Stoney Case
 Chris Cash
 Aveion Cason
 Howard "Hopalong" Cassady
 Toby Caston
 John Cavosie
 Jeff Chadwick
 Ike Charlton
 Raphel Cherry
 Frank Christensen
 George Christensen
 Jack Christiansen
 Pete Chryplewicz
 Chris Claiborne
 Dutch Clark
 Jessie Clark
 Robert Clark
 Willie Clay
 Ollie Cline
 Garry Cobb
 Avon Cobourne
 Shaun Cody
 Michael Cofer
 Gail Cogdill
 Tommy Colella
 Andre Collins
 Harry Colon
 Mike Compton
 Jack Concannon
 Scott Conover
 Gene Cook
 Ted Cook
 George Cooper
 Chip Cox
 Lou Creekmur
 Ted Cremer
 Ray Crockett
 Gene Cronin
 Larry Croom
 Germane Crowell
 Curley Culp
 Daunte Culpepper
 Donté Curry

D

 Ken Dallafior
 Gary Danielson
 James David
 A. J. Davis
 Ben Davis
 Buster Davis
 Eric Davis
 Frank Davis
 Glenn "Jeep" Davis
 James Davis
 Mike Dawson
 Tony Daykin
 Bill DeCorrevont
 Bob DeFruiter
 Marcus Demps
 Rick DeMulling
 Jerry DePoyster
 John Deraney
 John Derby
 Chuck DeShane
 Ty Detmer
 Jared DeVries
 Ebby DeWeese
 Dorne Dibble
 Chris Dieterich
 Don Doll
 Tony Dollinger
 Jim Doran
 Keith Dorney
 Bob Dove
 D. J. Dozier
 Shane Dronett
 Reuben Droughns
 Eddie Drummond
 T. J. Duckett
 Bill Dudley

E

 Blaine Earon
 Eric Ebron                                                                                                                                                                          * Harry Ebding
 Nick Eddy
 Dovonte Edwards
 Kalimba Edwards
 Stan Edwards
 Troy Edwards
 Joe Ehrmann
 Edmund Eiden
 Cleveland Elam
 Donnie Elder
 Homer Elias
 Gary Ellerson
 Devale Ellis
 Ken Ellis
 Lawrence Ellis
 Luther Elliss
 Bert Emanuel
 Bob Emerick
 Ox Emerson
 Greg Engle
 Doug English
 Fred Enke
 Russell Erxleben
 Doug Evans
 Leon Evans
 Murray Evans
 Dick Evey

F

 Terry Fair
 Nick Fairley
 Mike Fanning
 Ken Fantetti
 Andy Farkas
 Mel Farr
 Mike Farr
 Miller Farr
 Joseph Fauria
 Joe Ferguson
 Keith Ferguson
 Jason Fife
 Travis Fisher
 Bill Fisk
 Casey FitzSimmons
 Dick Flanagan
 Ed Flanagan
 Jamar Fletcher
 Roman Fortin
 George Foster
 Amos Fowler
 Vernon Fox
 Bill Fralic
 Eric Frampton
 Dennis Franklin
 Todd Franz
 Rob Fredrickson
 Rockne Freitas
 Gus Frerotte
 William Frizzell
 Steve Furness
 Mike Furrey

G

 Bob Gagliano
 Frank Gallagher
 Billy Gambrell
 Jeff Garcia
 Olandis Gary
 Frank Gatski
 William Gay
 Gene Gedman
 Jim Gibbons
 Aaron Gibson
 Dennis Gibson
 Jimmie Giles
 Sloko Gill
 Harry Gilmer
 Earl Girard
 Bill Glass
 Kevin Glover
 Jerry Golsteyn
 John Gonzaga
 Jeff Gooch
 André Goodman
 Lamar Gordon
 John Gordy
 Kent Graham
 Aaron Grant
 Mel Gray
 Don Greco
 Barrett Green
 Curtis Green
 Donnie Green
 Jacquez Green
 Willie Green
 John Greene
 Donovan Greer
 Terry Greer
 James Griffin
 Matt Grootegoed
 Brock Gutierrez
 Ace Gutowsky

H

 Elmer Hackney
 Az-Zahir Hakim
 James Hall
 Ron Hall
 Tom Hall
 Ty Hallock
 Paris Hamilton
 Gene Hamlin
 Larry Hand
 Chuck Hanneman
 Jason Hanson
 Jim Harbaugh
 Pat Harder
 Roger Harding
 Jim Hardy
 Dwayne Harper
 James Harrell
 Joey Harrington
 Claude Harriott
 Arlen Harris
 Clark Harris
 Corey Harris
 Nick Harris
 Leon Hart
 Jeff Hartings
 George Hekkers
 Jack Helms
 John Henderson
 Ralph Heywood
 Donnie Hickman
 Kevin Hickman
 LaMarcus Hicks
 Wally Hilgenberg
 Rusty Hilger
 David Hill
 Greg Hill
 Harlon Hill
 J. D. Hill
 Jimmy Hill
 Rod Hill
 John Hilton
 Eric Hipple
 Robert Hoernschemeyer
 Darius Holland
 Vernon Holland
 John Hollar
 Rodney Holman
 Earl Holmes
 Jerry Holmes
 Terrence Holt
 Mitch Hoopes
 Tyrone Hopson
 Desmond Howard
 Marv Hubbard
 Chuck Hughes
 James Hunter
 Scott Hunter
 Richard Huntley

I

 Corvey Irvin
 LeRoy Irvin
 Sedrick Irvin
 Ralph Isselhardt
 Bob Ivory
 Chidi Iwuoma
 George Izo

J

 Ernie Jackson
 Tyoka Jackson
 Garry James
 John James
 Tommy James
 George Jamison
 Paul Janus
 Ray Jarvis
 Dick Jauron
 Shawn Jefferson
 Greg Jeffries
 Ken Jenkins
 Leon Jenkins
 Melvin Jenkins
 Ron Jessie
 John Jett
 Andre Johnson
 Calvin Johnson
 Jimmie Johnson
 John Henry Johnson
 Kevin Johnson
 Keshon Johnson
 Kyle Johnson
 Levi Johnson
 Mike Johnson
 Pepper Johnson
 Richard Johnson
 Spider Johnson
 Gordon Jolley
 David Jones
 James Jones (RB)
 James Jones (DL)
 Jim Jones
 Kevin Jones
 Richard Jordan
 Matt Joyce
 Steve Junker

K

 Vyto Kab
 Rick Kane
 Carl Karilivacz
 Rich Karlis
 Keith Karpinski
 Alex Karras
 Theodore Karras
 Kevin Kasper
 Jim Kearney
 Kenoy Kennedy
 Greg Kent
 John Kidd
 Horace King
 Matt Kinzer
 David Kircus
 Travis Kirschke
 Jon Kitna
 Lee Kizzire
 Ed Klewicki
 Jeff Komlo
 David Kopay
 Joe Kopcha
 Kyle Kosier
 Mike Kostiuk
 Bob Kowalkowski
 Scott Kowalkowski
 Erik Kramer
 Ron Kramer
 Dave Krieg
 Clint Kriewaldt
 Joe Krol
 Ray Krouse
 Bert Kuczynski

L

 Antwan Lake
 Greg Landry
 Dick Lane
 Bill Larson
 Yale Lary
 Jim Laslavic
 Donald Laster
 Burton Lawless
 Bobby Layne
 Dick LeBeau
 Edward Lee
 Gary Lee
 Larry Lee
 Teddy Lehman
 Paris Lenon
 Alex Lewis
 Danny Lewis
 Jeremy Lincoln
 Augie Lio
 David Little
 Chris Liwienski
 Dave Lloyd
 Antonio London
 Chuck Long
 Joe Don Looney
 Gary Lowe
 Mike Lucci
 Roy Lumpkin
 Bob Lusk
 David Lutz
 Todd Lyght

M

 Milton Mack
 Leroy Massey
 Elmer Madarik
 Dante Magnani
 Bruce Maher
 Gil Mains
 Don Majkowski
 Bill Malinchak
 Pete Mandley
 Bob Mann
 Errol Mann
 Brock Marion
 Amos Marsh
 Jim Martin
 Sam Martin
 Glenn Martínez
 Robert Massey
 Riley Matheson
 Trevor Matich
 Ollie Matson
 Aubrey Matthews
 Jack Mattiford
 Earl Maves
 Vernon Maxwell
 Vince Mazza
 Reese McCall
 Dee McCann
 Willie McClung
 Darris McCord
 Josh McCown
 Mike McCoy
 Earl McCullouch
 Les McDonald
 Mike McDonald
 Shaun McDonald
 Stockar McDougle
 Hugh McElhenny
 Jon McGraw
 Thurman "Fum" McGraw
 Lynn McGruder 
 Sean McHugh
 Don McIlhenny
 Bill McKalip
 Kenneth McKiniry
 Dennis McKnight
 Tim McKyer
 Thomas McLemore
 Mike McMahon
 Ryan McNeil
 Bruce McNorton
 R. W. McQuarters
 Mike Meade
 Jim Mello
 Leland D. Melvin
 John Mendenhall
 Pete Metzelaars
 Brandon Middleton
 Dave Middleton
 Steve Mike-Mayer
 Andy Miketa
 Glyn Milburn
 Joe Milinichik
 Bob Miller
 Rick Mirer
 Jim Mitchell
 Pete Mitchell
 Scott Mitchell
 Shirdonya Mitchell
 Alex Molden
 Greg Montgomery
 Wilbert Montgomery
 Mike Montler
 Derrick Moore
 Herman Moore
 Langston Moore
 Jack Morlock
 Earl Morrall
 Jon Morris
 Don Morrison
 Johnnie Morton
 Jim Moscrip
 Zefross Moss
 Don Muhlbach
 Edwin Mulitalo
 Bill Munson
 Matt Murphy
 Eddie Murray

N

 Richard Nardi
 Paul Naumoff
 Reed Nelson
 Mark Nichols
 Jim Ninowski
 Bob Niziolek
 Niko Noga
 Ben Noll
 John Noppenberg
 Ulysses Norris
 Doug Nott
 Tom Nowatzke

O

 Brad Oates
 Duncan Obee
 Jim O'Brien
 Phil Odle
 Anthony Office
 Rick Ogle
 Chris Oldham
 Ray Oldham
 Mitchell Olenski
 Brock Olivo
 Johnny Olszewski
 Ed O'Neil
 Bill O'Neill
 Kevin O'Neill
 Ed Opalewski
 Dan Orlovsky
 Greg Orton
 Herb Orvis
 J. T. O'Sullivan
 Don Overton
 Dan Owens
 John Owens
 Steve Owens

P

 Tony Paige
 Paul Palmer
 Don Panciera
 Buddy Parker
 Willie Parker
 Eddie Payton
 Dave Pearson
 Lindy Pearson
 Rodney Peete
 Brett Perriman
 Gerry Perry
 Lawrence Pete
 Stephen Peterman
 Frosty Peters
 Julian Peterson
 Nick Pietrosante
 John Pingel
 Cleveland Pinkney
 Artose Pinner
 Milt Plum
 Marcus Pollard
 Robert Porcher
 Daryl Porter
 Ron Powlus
 Matt Prater
 Merv Pregulman
 Glenn Presnell
 Kelvin Pritchett
 Cory Procter
 Etric Pruitt
 Alfred Pupunu
 Dave Pureifory
 Jim Pyne

Q

 Jerry Quaerna
 Bill Quinlan
 Glover Quin

R

 Warren Rabb
 Mike Rabold
 Wali Rainer
 Dominic Raiola
 Manuel Ramirez
 Derrick Ramsey
 Al Randolph
 Walter Rasby
 Rocky Rasley
 Wayne Rasmussen
 Cory Redding
 Lucien Reeberg
 Joe Reed
 Frank Reich
 Jerry Reichow
 Bob Reynolds
 Alan Ricard
 Benny Ricardo
 Jim Ricca
 Matthew Rice
 David Richards
 Ray Richards
 Mikhael Ricks
 Dick Rifenburg
 Lee Riley
 Ron Rivers
 Joe Robb
 Ray Roberts
 Marcus Robinson
 Ramzee Robinson
 Shelton Robinson
 Mark Rodenhauser
 Charles Rogers
 Shaun Rogers
 Juan Roque
 Ken Roskie
 Tobin Rote
 Mike Roussos
 Mark Royals
 Rob Rubick
 Cliff Russell
 Matt Russell
 Sod Ryan
 Lou Rymkus

S

 Blaine Saipaia
 Dan Saleaumua
 Harvey Salem
 John Sanchez
 Barry Sanders
 Charlie Sanders
 Daryl Sanders 
 Eric Sanders
 Ken Sanders
 Mickey Sanzotta
 Don Sasa
 Bill Saul
 Cory Sauter
 Cory Schlesinger
 Joe Schmidt
 John Schneller
 Ivan Schottel
 Bill Schroeder
 Bill Schroll
 Kurt Schulz
 Stuart Schweigert
 Clyde Scott
 Freddie Scott
 Jonathan Scott
 Tracy Scroggins
 Tony Semple
 Harley Sewell
 Deck Shelley
 Bill Shepherd
 Edell Shepherd
 Roger Shoals
 Dave Simmons
 Jack Simmons
 Dave Simonson
 Ken Simonton
 Billy Sims
 Ernie Sims
 Frank Sinkwich
 Tom Skladany
 David Sloan
 Bob Smith
 Bobby Smith
 Corey Smith
 Harry Smith
 J.D. Smith
 Keith Smith
 Otis Smith
 Paul Smith
 Ricky Smith
 Wayne Smith
 Bob Sneddon
 Joe Soboleski
 Alonzo Spellman
 Ollie Spencer
 Paul Spicer
 Chris Spielman
 Marc Spindler
 Ed Stacco
 Matthew Stafford
 Brenden Stai
 Luke Staley
 Dick Stanfel
 Walter Stanley
 Drew Stanton
 Stephen Starring
 Jim Steffen
 James Stewart
 Ryan Stewart
 Bill Stits
 Barry Stokes
 Dick Stovall
 Troy Stradford
 Tom Strauthers
 Tai Streets
 Rich Strenger
 Pat Studstill
 John Dickson Stufflebeem
 Leo Sugar
 Ndamukong Suh
 Ivory Sully
 Ian Sunter
 Bill Swancutt
 Karl Sweetan
 Bill Swiacki
 Larry Swider
 Pat Swilling
 Reggie Swinton
 Rudy Sylvan

T

 Tyree Talton
 Damon Tassos
 Bob Tatarek
 Terry Tautolo
 Altie Taylor
 Henry Taylor
 Johnathan Taylor
 Terry Taylor
 Jim Teal
 Larry Tearry
 Garth TenNapel
 Derek Tennell
 Nat Terry
 Larry Tharpe
 Bob Thomas
 Broderick Thomas
 Cal Thomas
 Corey Thomas
 Henry Thomas
 Marvin Thomas
 Russ Thomas
 Jim Thomason
 Bobby Thompson (DB)
 Bobby Thompson (RB)
 Leonard Thompson
 Marty Thompson
 Robert Thompson
 Vince Thompson
 Josh Thornhill
 Craphonso Thorpe
 Jim Thrower
 Owen Thuerk
 Ed Tillison
 Jim Todd
 Stuart Tolle
 Lou Tomasetti
 Mike Tomczak
 Tony Tonelli
 Ted Topor
 LaVern Torgeson
 Gino Torretta
 Tom Tracy
 Mack Travis
 John Treadway
 Buzz Trebotich
 Stephen Trejo
 Thomas Tressa
 Bill Triplett
 Wallace Triplett
 John Tripson
 Frank Tripucka
 Eric Truvillion
 Sam Tsoutsouvas
 Rex Tucker
 Tom Tuinei
 Stephen Tulloch
 Darrell Tully
 Harold Turner
 Vernon Turner
 Tom Turnure
 Maurice Tyler

U

 Emil Uremovich
 Mike Utley
 Iheanyi Uwaezuoke

V

 Courtney Van Buren
 Kyle Vanden Bosch
 Doug Van Horn
 Sean Vanhorse
 Art Van Tone
 Fred Vanzo
 Tommy Vardell
 Larry Vargo
 Charles Vaughan
 Tom Vaughn
 Ross Verba
 Walter Vezmar
 Scottie Vines

W

 John Waerig
 John Wager
 Sid Wagner
 Bracy Walker
 Brian Walker
 Darnell Walker
 Doak Walker
 Doak Walker
 Marquis Walker
 Wayne Walker
 Troy Walters
 Chuck Walton
 Larry Walton
 Bill Ward
 Andre Ware
 Lamont Warren
 Dave Washington
 Gene Washington
 Keith Washington
 Bobby Watkins
 Larry Watkins
 Tommy Watkins
 Joe Watt
 Nate Wayne
 Jim Weatherall
 Charlie Weaver
 Herman Weaver
 Mike Weger
 Howard Weiss
 Herb Welch
 Jim Welch
 Mike Wells
 Warren Wells
 Charlie West
 Bryant Westbrook
 Bob Westfall
 Chet Wetterlund
 Byron White
 Dewayne White
 Sheldon White
 Stan White
 William White
 Daniel Whyte
 Bob Whitlow
 Dave Whitsell
 Lloyd Wickett
 Doug Widell
 James Wilder Sr.
 Dan Wilkinson
 Brian Williams
 Eric Williams
 Jimmy Williams
 Mike Williams
 Roy Williams
 Sam Williams
 Stanley Wilson
 Randy Winkler
 John Witkowski
 Richie Woit
 Alex Wojciechowicz
 John Woodcock
 Jerry Woods
 Larry Woods
 LeVar Woods
 Damien Woody
 Butch Woolfolk
 Sam Wyche

X
No players

Y

 Jim Yarbrough
 Garo Yepremian
 Adrian Young
 Dave Yovanovits
 Walt Yowarsky

Z

 Roger Zatkoff
 Jerry Zawadzkas
 Roy Zimmerman
 Mickey Zofko
 Anthony Zuzzio

References

  

Det
 
players